Mass civilian casualties of Israeli bombing, shelling and rocket attacks on the Gaza Strip have occurred in the Israeli–Palestinian conflict, in which Israeli bombing attacks on the Gaza Strip cause numerous civilian fatalities. The reason for such operations is purportedly to carry out targeted assassinations of militants from Hamas, Islamic Jihad and other groups seen to be a threat to Israel, whose Shin Bet data banks monitor thousands of Palestinians for targeting. Israel regards such cases as either unfortunate errors, the consequence of civilians being used to shield militants, or as acceptable collateral damage.

2002
On 22 July 2002 an Israeli F-16 dropped a one-ton bomb on the three-story apartment where Salah Shehade and his family, together with numerous other families, dwelt in the midst of the Daraj residential neighbourhood of Gaza City full of many other apartment blocks. The death toll amounted to 17 people,  of whom 15 were civilians, 11 were children. In addition to Shehadeh and his bodyguard, and 15 residents killed, a further 150 were wounded by collateral damage. The then Israeli Minister for Defense, Benjamin Ben-Eliezer, stated that their information was that no civilians were in the building at the time. Dan Halutz, a year latter, admitted that when taking the decision, both the government and the IDF were fully aware Shehadeh's wife was with him, but went ahead with the operation nonetheless.

Reactions
The then Prime Minister Ariel Sharon called the bombing "one of our most successful operations". Halutz in an interview where he called on NGOs like Gush Shalom to be incriminated for treason for exposing the realities, also stated no changes would be made in the decision-making and operational procedures that led to the bombing. In protesting the operation, 27 Israeli pilots signed a letter expressing their refusal to continue to participate in bombing flights over Gaza.

2009

Zeitoun

The Zeitoun Incident took place on 5 January 2009 during Operation Cast Lead, after members of the Samouni extended family had been herded out of their homes and told to relocate to another building. In a dawn raid on the 4th, a raid into one Samouni house, using grenades and live fire, killed Ateya al-Samouni and severely wounded a four-year-old child, Ahmad, who was refused medical treatment. One of the Samoiuni men was fluent in Hebrew from working as a mechanic in Israel for 35 years and introduced the gathered members of Samouni family to Givati soldiers. The men were blindfolded and led away, and eventually 100 people, mostly women and children, were corralled into a cement block warehouse for storing fruit and vegetables.
The day after the latter was subject to artillery fire and missiles from either a drone or an Apache helicopter overhead, killing 21 members of Wa'el al-Samouni's family while wounding dozens of others. The initial log at the al-Shifa hospital registered 39 al-Samouni members requiring emergency treatment.

The airstrike was ordered by Colonel Ilan Malka, then commander of the Givati Brigade, who had called up the attack after interpreting drone photographs of a cache of wooden boards the family had stacked to light a fire and heat water as rocket propelled grenades. The men had ventured out that morning through the front door to scrounge up some firewood, and an Israeli military outpost lay a mere 80 metres away, troops were positioned on rooftops and patrols were regular with frequent interactions with local residents. When Samouni men tried to pull the injured from the ruins they were turned back with slogans, such as one – "Go back into death!" - in classical Arabic. Three days later, the IDF finally permitted Palestinian rescue teams to enter the area, and recovered 13 family members, several children, still alive. On their evacuation, the IDF bulldozed the house, and, after the conclusion of hostilities, family members came across hands and legs still poking out up from the rubble.

Aftermath
Malka was reprimanded later for using tank fire on heavily populated areas and was then appointed supervisor in the Israeli prison Service(Shabas), at least half of whose detainees are Palestinian. Despite investigations both by an internal command unit and a Military Police Investigation Unit, according to B'Tselem, no reason has ever been forthcoming for the shelling. In May 2012 Mag's Major Dorit Tuval stated that investigations excluded claims civilians were deliberately harmed or the victims of criminal negligence. For the period in question, they did indict a soldier for stealing a Palestinian civilian's credit card, another for using a 9-year-old boy as a human shield, and a third for the manslaughter of a Palestinian whose identity was not known.

al-Fakhura school

On 9 January 2014, at around 4 pm, Israel launched at a minimum four mortar shells which caused 35 dead at two different sites, in Jabalia, within 100 metres of each other, and an estimated 40 other casualties. One shell landing in the courtyard of the al-Deeb family home where, unable to purchase bread, the family had sat down to bake it, and killed 11 people gathered there, while the other three hit al-Fakhura street, killing another 24. Of the 11 members of the al-Deeb family, 4 were women and 4 children.

The 3 other mortar shellings struck the outside of the UNWRA school.

Aftermath
Brigadier general Ilan Tal stated that the mortar crews had shot back to save their own lives.

The Goldstone Mission concluded that firing mortars into an area were 1,368 people were crowded, in a nearby UNWRA school, in order to kill a small number of militants - Israel later alleged a mortar had been fired at their forces from somewhere in that vicinity - cannot meet the terms of proportionality for warranting the military advantage gained thereby.

2014
In what it called Operation Protective Edge launched on 8 July 2014, Israel announced it would strike houses of senior Palestinian activists in Gaza and residences which were deemed operative centres. To avoid casualties, it stated a roof knocking procedure and telephone warnings would be given in advance to alert civilians inside to evacuate within 5 minutes. In the first two days, 11 such homes were attacked with this method. According to the Israeli NGO B'Tselem this tactic contravenes International Humanitarian Law, though some interpretations challenge that view.

Kaware family home

At about 1:30 pm on 8 July 2014, the families in Ahmad Kaware's apartment block were informed of the imminent bombing of their 3-storey 7 apartment home, and were instructed to leave. One of the sons,'Odeh Kaware', was a member of Hamas's military wing. The family members, together with some neighbours waited outside. An hour and twenty minutes later, at 2:50 pm, a drone-launched missile was observed to have struck the building's solar heated water tank on the roof. Several family members and neighbours, after waiting some minutes, then entered the residence, and four reached the roof. Within ten minutes, at 3:00 pm., an F-16 fighter fired a missile which struck the building, causing it to collapse. In the IDF reconstruction, the pilot believed the building was empty when he fired. As the missile flew to its target, people were observed on the roof, but no technical means were available to avert the attack.

8 civilians were killed in the strike, including six children. 28 other people were injured, 10 of whom severely.

In its initial declaration the IDF stated that this and other homes bombed that day were attacked because they were the homes of militants. A later comuniqué, reportedly adjusting the justification in order to comply with international law distinctions, reframed the bombing as one aimed at operative military centres. The Israeli army through its Military Advocate General's investigation was absolved of any malfeasance, writing that there was no fault in the actions of the IDF forces involved, and that despite the fact that the attack resulted in a regrettable outcome, it does not affect its legality post facto.'

Hamad family home

At 11:40 pm on the same day, 8 July 2014, just as the family had retired to bed, the home of Hafez Hamad in Beit Hanoun was bombed without, according to B'Tselem, any prior warning. Hamad was a member of Islamic Jihad's military wing, and the bombing was a targeted assassination. Six people, one militant and five civilians, were killed in the airstrike. In addition, three children were wounded.

Fun Time Beach café bombing 

At 11.30 pm on 9 July 2014, during the opening phase of Israel's attack on the Gaza Strip, 9 youths gathered at the Fun Time Beach café run by the al-Sawalli family on the beachfront at al-'Izbeh, near Khan Younis to watch a match between Argentina and the Netherlands in the 2014 FIFA World Cup knockout stage were killed when an Israeli missile destroyed the shack.

Zoroub family
Around midnight on 1 August 2014, without prior warning, an Israeli airstrike struck the home of Rafat Oudeh Mohammed Zoroub in western Rafah killing 15 family members, 4 women and 11 children, A further 4 people in the building at the time were wounded.

2019

al-Madhun family 
On late Sunday afternoon, 5 May 2019, a complex in the al-'Atatrah neighborhood comprising a grocery store and three residential units, owned and inhabited by the extended al-Madhun family in the western sector of Beit Lahiya were targeted for an airstrike. 3 members of the family, and a neighbour, were killed by the missile.

Another five children of the family were wounded, together with the neighbour's daughter. The purpose of the strike was to kill 'Abdallah al-Madhun the son, known to be a local operative for Islamic Jihad's armed wing, Saraya Al-Quds. Amani's fetus was later identified by the husband as one of the dead.

Zoroub Building strike
On 5 May 2019 at 5:40 pm in succession three Israeli missiles, including a GBU-39 series guided bomb, struck the lower floors of the six floor Zoroub building in Rafah. The Israeli army's Twitter account related that they had struck "terrorist operatives" at that time. According to Human Rights Watch, the three victims appear to have been civilians.

Local testimonies said that Islamic Jihad had had a media office in the building, until they moved to another location three months earlier. Human Rights Watch concluded from an investigation that there was no evidence for the building being a current military objective.

The al-Ghazali/al-Jidyan families
Three hours after the al-Madhun strike, at 8 pm on Sunday 5 May 2019 an Israeli airstrike on a building in the Sheikh Zayed residential complex of Beit Lahiya killed six civilians, including a police officer or legal advisor to the Gazan Interior Ministry, from two families resident on the top fifth floor.

9 other people were injured by the strike. According to testimony by the al-Jidyan couple's surviving son, Muhammad Abu al-Jidyan, no prior warning, either by telephone or roof knocking had been given. According to local reports, no militants were present in the building, while Human Rights Watch concluded that one militant was in the site at the time. He had just entered the building and was walking up the stairs when the strike was unleashed. He was not injured.

Al-Sawarki family
After the Israeli targeted assassination of Baha Abu al-Ata triggered a round of fighting, Gazan militants responded and the incidents escalated. Over two days 34 Gazan militants were killed. Sources in Gaza claim 16 were civilians  were killed, while 111 were injured and 63 Israelis required medical treatment.
Just before hostilities ended, 9 members of the Malhous family, including five children and two women, related to the Bedouin Al-Sawarka clan, were killed when an IAF air raid deployed two fighters armed with four JDAMs to target two flimsy tin sheds in Deir al-Balah, one of several in a complex of rundown shacks and greenhouses, where the family lived.  The result was a crater measuring 50 feet wide and 20 feet deep. The strike took place just hours before a ceasefire was due to take effect. The high resolution aerial photography available for such targeting should have revealed that what the Israeli military called a compound, to be nothing more than two shacks.

Israel defence officials later stated they were surprised by the casualties and admitted it had been a mistake. According to local sources they were a simple sheep and goat-herding folk who had resided there, in a shack devoid of water and electricity, for a long time, some claimed 20 years. It is no secret, Gazan sources say, that top commanders in the area do not live in squalor, as did the family of Abu Malhous.
Initially, the IDF's Arabic-language spokesman, Avichay Adraee falsely claimed that the father Abu Malhous had been in command of Islamic Jihad's rocket squadrons in central Gaza. No such person is known to belong to the Islamic Jihad organization. The report was declared to be false by Haaretz, and admitted to be so later by Israeli Defence officials who looked into the matter. It was reported that Avichay Adraee based his statement on a rumour circulating among civilian users of an Israeli Telegram group, and that the army's original identification of the shack as terrorist infrastructure was based on rumours in social media. It emerged that Israeli intelligence hadn't reportedly controlled the target for a year prior to the strike, that no check had been conducted to ensure civilians were not present, and that the site had not been reexamined by Israeli intelligence agencies in the preceding months.
Islamic Jihad identified the photo of the assumed Jihad militant provided by the IDF spokesman as the victim of the strike as that of another person, a commander in Rafah, who is still alive.

Military officials in Israel stated that "civilian casualties are unavoidable in Gaza's teeming neighborhoods" The IDF, promising an investigation, stated that they were still trying to figure out what the family had been doing on the site, but undertook to examine and review the case in detail. In December 2019, the Israeli investigation admitted a mistake had been made from an error in its data base, that had failed to note that it was a civilian area with, in the IDF's view, had some military use', for which Palestinian factions were to blame.

Reactions
Gideon Levy commented:
Had they been Israeli citizens, the state would have moved heaven and earth to avenge the blood of its famous little boy, and the world would have reeled in shock at the cruelty of Palestinian terror.
The European Union urged Israel to ensure that the investigation it conducts is "transparent", saying it would "closely follow it". Hamas, which controls the Gaza Strip, said that it would call on the International Criminal Court to look into the incident.
Farhan Haq, speaking for the office of UN Secretary General António Guterres, urged Israel to move swiftly to investigate the incident. The European Union, undertaking to monitor the case, also called on Israel to ensure its investigation would be "transparent". The governing power of the Gaza Strip, Hamas, broached the idea of asking the International Criminal Court to examine the incident.

2021
According to the Gazan Ministry of Health, there were 243 deaths and over 1910 injuries, including both civilians and militants, over the course of the May 2021 conflict. The death toll includes 65 children and 39 women. The injury count includes 560 children, 380 women, and 91 elderly. The U.N claims 116 civilians were killed in IDF strikes. The IDF claims at least 225 militants were killed, but did not release a comprehensive civilian death toll. However, they did acknowledge 42 civilians were killed during their attacks on the underground tunnel network

Al-Wehda Street Airstrikes
After midnight on Sunday, May 16, 2021, the Israeli Air Force launched a series of airstrikes on Al-Wehda Street in the middle of the Gaza Strip and the Israeli bombing continued into the early hours of dawn. 46 civilians were killed, including ten women and eight children, in addition to fifty injuries with various wounds. The casualties were mostly women and children. Based on the statements of the survivors and the Palestinian Ministry of Health, all members of the al-Kulak family and the Abu al-Auf family were killed.

See also
 Al-Dalu family killing
 Casualties of the Gaza War (2008–2009)
 Gaza–Israel clashes (November 2019)
 Military operations of the Israeli–Palestinian conflict

Notes

Citations

Sources

Further reading

Gaza–Israel conflict
War casualties